The 1933 VFL Grand Final was an Australian rules football game contested between the Richmond Football Club and South Melbourne Football Club, held at the Melbourne Cricket Ground in Melbourne on 30 September 1933. It was the 35th annual Grand Final of the Victorian Football League, staged to determine the premiers for the 1933 VFL season. The match, attended by 75,754 spectators, was won by South Melbourne by a margin of 42 points, marking that club's third premiership victory. Richmond's total of 4.5 (29) remains the lowest score conceded by South Melbourne since the famous Round 12, 1919 match against St. Kilda where South scored 17.4 (106) in the last quarter.

Bob Pratt kicked three goals for South Melbourne which saw him overtake Gordon Coventry as the 1933 season's leading goalkicker.

South Melbourne's premiership side was often referred to as the "foreign legion" due to the high number of players in the team who had been recruited from interstate. The majority of their recruits around that time came from Western Australia which earned South Melbourne the nickname "Swans".

This was the first of two successive years in which these teams met in the premiership decider. In the 1934 VFL Grand Final it was Richmond which emerged victorious. South Melbourne did not win another premiership for 72 years, eventually winning the 2005 AFL Grand Final — as the "Sydney Swans" — having relocating to Sydney in 1982.

Teams

 Umpire – Bob Scott

Statistics

Score

Goal kickers
South Melbourne:
 Pratt 3
 Brain 2
 Diggins 2
 Reville 1
 Thomas 1

Richmond:
 Farmer 2
 Martin 1
 Strang 1

See also
 1933 VFL season

References

External links

VFL/AFL Grand Finals
Grand
Sydney Swans
Richmond Football Club
September 1933 sports events